The Royal Australasian College of Medical Administrators (RACMA) is an accredited specialist medical college comprising medical practitioners with specialist training in management and leadership of health services and systems. Fellows of the college combine clinical knowledge, skill, and judgement and apply this at an organisation wide level. This may include administering or managing a hospital or other health service, or developing health operational policy, or planning or purchasing health services. The college is responsible for the training of medical professionals as specialist health leaders in Australia and New Zealand and has responsibility for assessing candidates and awarding the qualification of Fellowship of the college (FRACMA) to medical practitioners.

About
The Royal Australasian College of Medical Administrators was founded in 1967 in response to the emergence of medical leadership as a specialty in its own right.
There are currently more than 800 Fellows of the college made up of medical specialists from diverse positions in public hospital networks, government, and private organisations.
   
The college reports that its roles are:
To set educational standards;
Accredit educational programs;
Organise a continuing education program for Fellows and Associate Fellows;
Conduct examinations;
Nurture, guide and encourage Candidates, Associate Fellows and Fellows; and
Assist clinicians and public health personnel who are increasingly being required to manage their clinical departments and public health programs and in addition to providing a clinical service.

RACMA is a member, and current chair of the Steering Committee, of the World Federation of Medical Managers.

History
The college formed as the Australian College of Medical Administrators (ACMA) on 21 March 1967 with 279 founding fellows. On 6 August 1979, royal assent was granted for use of the prefix 'Royal' to the Australian College of Medical Administrators. In 1998, the college formed links with New Zealand and the college was renamed to the current Royal Australasian College of Medical Administrators.

The college was formally recognised by the National Specialist Qualification Advisory Committee in 1980 as the appropriate examining body for the specialty of medical administration, rendering Fellowship a nationally recognised specialist medical qualification.

Governance
The Royal Australasian College of Medical Administrators is a Company Limited by Guarantee governed under a constitution adopted in 2010. The College National office is located in Melbourne.

Membership of the College
Candidates complete a three-year Fellowship to be admitted as a Fellow of the RACMA (FRACMA). Candidates undertake a master's degree in Health Management or Public Health.
RACMA allows graduates of other medical specialty colleges to undertake a one-year Associate Fellowship to be admitted as an Associated Fellow of the RACMA (AFRACMA).

Trainees undertaking the Fellowship of the Australasian College for Emergency Medicine may undertake an elective rotation in a RACMA training post.

Publications
The RACMA publishes: 
The Quarterly: The journal of The Royal Australasian College of Medical Administrators.
A Strategic Plan details the RACMA's vision, purposes, values and ethical principles, and strategic and operational priorities for 2009–2011.
Annual reports

RACMA conference
The RACMA hosts an annual conference each year, inviting submissions on a chosen area of medical leadership and management. The 2016 Conference, held in Brisbane from 12 to 14 October, focused on Harm Free Healthcare.

See also
List of Specialist Medical Colleges
List of Australian organisations with royal patronage
World Federation of Medical Managers

References

External links
The Royal Australasian College of Medical Administrators

Medical and health organisations based in Australia
Medical education in Australia
Specialist medical colleges in Australia
Medical education in New Zealand
Australasian Medical Administrators
Medical associations based in Australia
Organisations based in Australia with royal patronage
Medical associations based in New Zealand
Organisations based in New Zealand with royal patronage
1967 establishments in Australia